The following Union Army units and commanders fought in the First Battle of Deep Bottom (July 27–29, 1864) of the American Civil War. The Confederate order of battle is listed separately.

Abbreviations used

Military Rank
 LTG = Lieutenant General
 MG = Major General
 BG = Brigadier General
 Col = Colonel
 Ltc = Lieutenant Colonel
 Maj = Major
 Cpt = Captain
 Lt = Lieutenant

Other
 w = wounded
 mw = mortally wounded
 k = killed
 c = captured

Union Forces

General in Chief
LTG Ulysses S. Grant

Army of the Potomac

MG George Meade

II Corps

MG Winfield Scott Hancock

Escort:
 1st Vermont Cavalry, Company M: Cpt John H. Hazelton

Engineers:
 1st Battalion, New York Infantry: Maj Wesley Brainerd

Chief of Artillery: Col John C. Tidball

Cavalry Corps

MG Philip Sheridan

Army of the James

MG Benjamin F. Butler

X Corps

XIX Corps

Cavalry

Naval forces

 USS Mendota: Commander Edward T. Nichols

See also

 Virginia in the American Civil War
 Siege of Petersburg

References
 Eicher, John H., and David J. Eicher. Civil War High Commands. Stanford, CA: Stanford University Press, 2001. .

American Civil War orders of battle